The Codex Theodosianus (Eng. Theodosian Code) was a compilation of the laws of the Roman Empire under the Christian emperors since 312. A commission was established by Emperor Theodosius II and his co-emperor Valentinian III on 26 March 429 and the compilation was published by a constitution of 15 February 438. It went into force in the eastern and western parts of the empire on 1 January 439. The original text of the codex is also found in the Breviary of Alaric (also called Lex Romana Visigothorum), promulgated on 2 February 506.

Development 
On 26 March 429, Emperor Theodosius II announced to the Senate of Constantinople his intentions to form a committee to codify all of the laws (leges, singular lex) from the reign of Constantine up to Theodosius II and Valentinian III. The laws in the code span from 312 to 438, so by 438 the "volume of imperial law had become unmanageable". Twenty-two scholars, working in two teams, worked for nine years starting in 429 to assemble what was to become the Theodosian Code. The chief overseer of the work was Antiochus Chuzon, a lawyer and a prefect and consul from Antioch.

Their product was a collection of 16 books containing more than 2,500 constitutions issued between 313 and 437, while, at the same time, omitting obsolete provisions and superfluous phrases, and making additions, emendations and alterations. John F. Matthews illustrated the importance of Theodosius' code when he said, "the Theodosian Code was the first occasion since the Twelve Tables on which a Roman government had attempted by public authority to collect and publish its leges." The code covers political, socioeconomic, cultural and religious subjects of the 4th and 5th centuries in the Roman Empire.

A collection of imperial enactments called the Codex Gregorianus had been written in c. 291-4 and the Codex Hermogenianus, a limited collection of rescripts from c. 295, was published. The Sirmondian Constitutions may also represent a small-scale collection of imperial laws. However, Theodosius desired to create a more comprehensive code that would provide greater insight into law during the later empire (321-429). According to Peter Stein, "Theodosius was perturbed at the low state of legal skill in his empire of the East." He apparently started a school of law at Constantinople. In 429 he assigned a commission to collect all imperial constitutions since the time of Constantine.

During the process of gathering the vast amount of material, often editors would have multiple copies of the same law. In addition to this, the source material the editors were drawing upon changed over time. Clifford Ando notes that according to Matthews, the editors "displayed a reliance on western provincial sources through the late 4th century and on central, eastern archives thereafter."

After six years an initial version was finished in 435, but it was not published, instead it was improved upon and expanded and finally finished in 438 and taken to the Senate in Rome and Constantinople. Matthews believes that the two attempts are not the result of a failed first attempt, but instead the second attempt shows "reiteration and refinement of the original goals at a new stage in the editorial process". Others have put forth alternate theories to explain the lengthy editorial process and two different commissions. Boudewijn Sirks believes that "the code was compiled from imperial copy books found at Constantinople, Rome, or Ravenna, supplemented by material at a few private collections, and that the delays were caused by such problems as verifying the accuracy of the text and improving the legal coherence of the work."

The tone of the work reflected the rhetorical training that the drafters had received and Averil Cameron has described it as "verbose, moralizing and pretentious".

Context 
The code was written in Latin and referred explicitly to the two capitals of Constantinople (Constantinopolitana) and Rome (Roma). It was also concerned with the imposition of orthodoxy - the Arian controversy was ongoing - within the Christian religion and contains 65 decrees directed at heretics.

Originally, Theodosius had attempted to commission leges generales beginning with Constantine to be used as a supplement for the Codex Gregorianus and the Codex Hermogenianus. He intended to supplement the legal codes with the opinions and writings of ancient Roman jurists, much like the digest found later in Justinian's Code. But the task proved to be too great, and in 435 it was decided to concentrate solely on the laws from Constantine to the time of writing. This decision defined the greatest difference between the Theodosian Code and Justinian's later Corpus Juris Civilis.

Matthews observes, "The Theodosian Code does, however, differ from the work of Justinian (except the Novellae), in that it was largely based not on existing juristic writings and collections of texts, but on primary sources that had never before been brought together." Justinian's Code, published about 100 years later, comprised both ius, "law as an interpretive discipline", and leges, "the primary legislation upon which the interpretation was based". While the first part, or codex, of Justinian's Corpus Civilis Juris contained 12 books of constitutions, or imperial laws, the second and third parts, the digest and the Institutiones, contained the ius of Classical Roman jurists and the institutes of Gaius.

While the Theodosian Code may seem to lack a personal facet due to the absence of judicial reviews, upon further review the legal code gives insight into Theodosius' motives behind the codification. Lenski quotes Matthews as noting that the "imperial constitutions represented not only prescriptive legal formulas but also descriptive pronouncements of an emperor’s moral and ideological principles".

Christianity 
Apart from clearing up confusion and creating a single, simplified and supersedent code, Theodosius II was also attempting to solidify Christianity as the official religion of the Empire, after it had been decriminalised under Galerius' rule and promoted under Constantine's. In his City of God, St. Augustine praised Theodosius the Great, Theodosius II's grandfather, who shared his faith and devotion to its establishment, as "a Christian ruler whose piety was expressed by the laws he had issued in favor of the Catholic Church".

The Codex Theodosianus is, for example, explicit in ordering that all actions at law should cease during Holy Week, and the doors of all courts of law be closed during those 15 days (1. ii. tit. viii.). It also instituted laws punishing homosexuality, which represented a departure from policy under the period of the Roman Republic, under which homosexuality was tolerated and perhaps mocked but was not illegal.

The first laws granting tax exemption to the church appear in the Codex and are credited to Constantine and his son Constantius II.  These laws specify that all clergy, their family members, and church-owned land was exempt from all compulsory service and tax payments, with the exception that land owned by the clerics themselves was still taxed.

Sources 
Books 1-5 lack the level of manuscript support available for books 6–16. The first five books of the surviving Codex draw largely from two other manuscripts. The Turin manuscript, also known as "T," consists of 43, largely discontinuous folios. The second manuscript is the Breviary of Alaric, and a good part of the Breviarium that is included in book 1 actually contains the original text of the respective part of the original codex.

The latter part of the Codex, books 6–16, drew largely from two texts as well. Books 6-8 of the Codex were preserved in the text of a document known as Parsinus 9643. The document circulated early medieval French libraries, as well as the other formative document for the latter part of the code, a document held in the Vatican (Vat. Reg. 886), also known as "V". Scholars consider this section to have been transmitted completely.

Editions 
The reference edition of the Codex Theodosianus is:
Mommsen-Meyer, Theodosiani libri XVI cum constitutionibus Sirmondianis et leges Novellae ad Theodosianum pertinentes, Berlin, Weidemann, 1905.

Other editions/commentaries

English translation 
The Theodosian Code was translated into English, with annotations, in 1952 by Clyde Pharr, Theresa Sherrer Davidson, and others. This translation was very favorably received by scholars.

See also
 Epigenius
 International Roman Law Moot Court

References

Notes

Citations

Sources

 ACTI. Auxilium in Codices Theodosianum Iustinianumque investigandos, Iole Fargnoli (cur.), LED Edizioni Universitarie, Milano 2009, 
 

  (reprinted in 1991)

 Codex Theodosianus. Liber V - Le Code Théodosien, Livre V. Texte latin d'après l'édition de Th. Mommsen. Traduction française, introduction et notes. Éd. par Sylvie Crogiez, Pierre Jaillette, Jean-Michel Poinsotte. Turnout, Brepols, 2009 (Codex Theodosianus - Le Code Théodosien (CTH), vol. 5).

External links

Primary sources
Codex Theodosianus (Latin), ancientrome.ru.
Codex Theodosianus (Latin)  Ed. Mommsen, Meyer, & Krueger (Latin). Website upmf-grenoble.fr.
 A list of imperial laws of 311 until 431 contains summaries of many laws involving religion from the Theodosian code and other sources, in chronological order.
 Codex Theodosianus  XI-7-13; XV-5-1, -12-1; XVI-1-2, -5-1, -5-3, -7-1, -10-4 (on Religion), English translation Oliver J. Thatcher e.a., 1907. Website fordham.edu.

Secondary sources
 Codex Theodosianus by George Long in A Dictionary of Greek and Roman Antiquities, John Murray, London, 1875.
 Codex Theodosianus Information on the code and its manuscript tradition on the  website. A database on Carolingian secular law texts (Karl Ubl, Cologne University, Germany).

5th-century books
Law books
Roman law
Byzantine law
Theodosian dynasty
Latin prose texts
Roman law codes
Theodosius II